Jeff Silva may refer to:
 Jeff Silva (footballer) (born 1986), Brazilian football player
 Jeff Daniel Silva, Boston, Massachusetts filmmaker